Doña Macabra is a Mexican telenovela produced by Ernesto Alonso for Telesistema Mexicano in 1963.

Cast 
Amparo Rivelles as Macabra
Ofelia Guilmáin as Demetria
Carmen Montejo
Narciso Busquets
Enrique Rambal

References

External links 

Mexican telenovelas
1963 telenovelas
Televisa telenovelas
1963 Mexican television series debuts
1963 Mexican television series endings
Spanish-language telenovelas